In the United States, Form 1099-R is a variant of Form 1099 used for reporting on distributions from pensions, annuities, retirement or profit sharing plans, IRAs, charitable gift annuities and Insurance Contracts. Form 1099-R is filed for each person who has received a distribution of $10 or more from any of the above.

Some of the items included on the form are the gross distribution, the amount of the distribution that is taxable, the amount withheld for tax purposes, and a code that represents the type of distribution made to plan holder.

Filing 
Form 1099-R must be mailed to the recipients by January 31 and to the IRS by the last day of February. If the custodian files with the IRS electronically, the form is due by March 31. The plan owner, the IRS and the municipal or state tax department (if applicable) all receive a copy of the form. These copies are used to cross-reference individual tax returns to ensure compliance. Any person who receives an erroneous 1099-R form should immediately contact the plan custodian who sent it in order to rectify the situation and avoid filing an incorrect tax return.

Taxable amount 
If no after-tax contributions were made to the pension plan before distribution, such as if the plan is a traditional IRA, the entire distribution is generally included as taxable income. However, in cases where after-tax contributions were made to an annuity or pension, only a portion of the distribution may be taxed.

Box 2 contains the amount of the distribution that is taxable. The taxable amount will be zero if the entire distribution is any of the following:
 A direct rollover (other than an IRR) from a qualified plan, a section 403(b) plan, or a governmental section 457(b) plan to another such plan or to a traditional IRA;
 A direct rollover from a designated Roth account, such as a Roth 401(k), to a Roth IRA;
 A traditional, SEP, or SIMPLE IRA directly transferred to an accepting employer plan;
 An IRA recharacterization;
 A nontaxable section 1035 exchange of life insurance, annuity, endowment or long-term care insurance contracts;
 A nontaxable charge or payment, for the purchase of a qualified long-term care insurance contract, against the cash value of an annuity contract or the cash surrender value of a life insurance contract.

Distribution codes 
The following table provides information on all the possible distribution codes in Box 7 of Form 1099-R.

Relation to other forms 
Form 1099-R reports the gross distribution from the custodian and how much of that amount is taxable. The plan owner uses this information to fill out lines 15 and 16 on Form 1040. Copy B of Form 1099-R is attached to Form 1040 only if federal income tax is withheld in box 4 of Form 1099-R.

With regards to IRAs, Form 1099-R is used for reporting distributions from an IRA while Form 5498 is used for reporting contributions to an IRA. Income earned (such as interest and dividends) through an IRA is not reported on either Form 1099-R or Form 5498.

Form RRB-1099-R "Pension and Annuity Income by the Railroad Retirement Board" is the Railroad Retirement Board counterpart to Form 1099-R.

Form W-4P "Withholding Certificate for Pension or Annuity Payments" is filed by payment recipients to inform payers the correct amount of tax to withhold from their payments. This amount is reported on Form 1099-R.

See also 
 IRS Tax Forms 
 Taxation in the United States

References

External links 
 Form 1099-R 2016
 Instructions for Form 1099-R

1099
1099
Retirement in the United States
Individual retirement accounts